USS Kanawha II (SP-130)/USS Piqua (SP-130) -- was a yacht acquired by the U.S. Navy during World War II. She was placed into service as an escort for Allied convoys traveling across the dangerous North Atlantic Ocean. German U-boats were active in sinking Allied ships, and Kanawha II (later renamed Piqua) provided a valuable service as a lookout and in one instance attacked one and drove it off. Post-war she was returned to her pre-war owner in July 1919.

Commissioning into the Navy
USS Kanawha II was built as the yacht Kanawha by Gas Engine and Power Co. and Charles L. Seabury Co., Morris Heights, New York, in 1898. She was acquired by the U.S. Navy from her owner, John Borden, April 28, 1917, and commissioned the same day as USS Kanawha II (SP–130) under the command of lieutenant commander Henry D. Cooke.

The Roman numeral II was used to avoid confusion with the Navy's replenishment oiler USS Kanawha (AO-1).

World War I service 
During her first three weeks of naval service Kanawha II performed various duties in the New York City area. Upon being outfitted for distant service she got underway for Brest, France June 19, 1917.  She arrived there July 4, 1917, in the vanguard of a flotilla of warships sent to aid that country following the United States' entry into World War II.

 
Two weeks later she began patrol off Brest. On September 3, 1917, she sighted her first enemy periscope off the French coast, but was unable to press an attack. On November 28 she sighted another closing on a convoy. She issued a submarine warning and the U-boat was later tracked and sunk by two other patrol vessels equipped with depth bombs. The convoy continued undamaged.

On March 1, 1918, she was renamed USS Piqua, the first Navy ship of that name, probably to avoid message confusion with the oiler Kanawha.

Attacking a German U-boat 
While steaming in convoy on July 16, 1918 the Piqua sighted the conning tower of a third U-boat-on an almost parallel heading.  She closed and commenced firing at 11,000 yards (10,058 meters).  Unable to see their target, the gun crew aimed according to estimated ranges and bearings called down to them from the bridge. Although she scored no hits her shells forced the U-boat to abandon her prey.
 
Piqua continued to operate off the French coast through the end of the War in November 1918 and into 1919.

Post-war decommissioning and disposal 
Piqua sailed for New York on May 20, 1919, and after stops in the Azores and Bermuda, anchored off Tompkinsville, Staten Island, in New York Harbor a month later. Later shifted to Morris Heights, New York, she was decommissioned and returned to her owner on July 1, 1919.

See also 
 USS Vedette (SP-163)

References 
  (archive)
 NavSource Online: Kanawha II / Piqua (SP 130)

Ships built in Morris Heights, Bronx
World War I patrol vessels of the United States
Patrol vessels of the United States Navy
Steam yachts
1898 ships